Marcus Ashton Ferkranus (born May 10, 2003) is an American professional soccer player who plays as a defender for Major League Soccer club LA Galaxy.

Career

LA Galaxy
Ferkranus joined the LA Galaxy academy in 2017, at the age of 14. In July 2020, he made his professional debut for the Galaxy's USL Championship affiliate, LA Galaxy II, coming on as an 81st-minute substitute for Jesús Vázquez in a 4–0 defeat to Phoenix Rising. After making just five appearances throughout the shortened 2020 season, Ferkranus became a regular for the team in 2021, tallying 26 appearances, 16 of which were starts.

In January 2021, Ferkranus was signed to a first-team contract with LA Galaxy.

Phoenix Rising (loan)
Ferkranus joined USL Championship club Phoenix Rising FC on a loan on July 26, 2022.

Career statistics

Club

Honors
United States U20
CONCACAF U-20 Championship: 2022

References

External links
Marcus Ferkranus at Major League Soccer

2003 births
Living people
LA Galaxy II players
LA Galaxy players
Phoenix Rising FC players
USL Championship players
American soccer players
Association football defenders
Soccer players from California
Homegrown Players (MLS)
United States men's under-20 international soccer players